Acula may refer to:

Acula (municipality), municipality in Veracruz, Mexico

See also
Dr. Acula (disambiguation)